The X1 is a fast, light-weight sailing dinghy designed for sailing on rivers, estuaries and inland waters by Phil Morrison. The dinghy is sailed by 2 or 3 people and has a main, a jib and a symmetric_spinnaker. The boat is designed to be easily driven in very light wind, easy to sail and rig and quick to tack. It has a PY of 949.. Currently the PY is the same as an RS400 but can perform better in light wind and slower in heavier winds.

The X0 is a variant of the original X1 with the same hull etc. but a smaller rig. The mast and three sails are different and can easily be substituted. This version is intended for beginners or lighter weight crew.
Differences in specification: Mast height: , Sail area - Main and Jib: , Sail area - Spinnaker: .

Race results include 3rd and 4th in the 2013 Three Rivers Race on the Norfolk Broads, 1st in Rheinwoche and Letzte Helden 2012 - Hamburg.

The X1 was boat tested by Yachts & Yachting and Yachting Life. The X0 by Yacht

References

External links 
 Official X1 website

 

Dinghies